Oleg Leontyevich Makarevich (born 30 December 1962) is a Russian army officer who has served as first deputy head of the Military Academy of the General Staff of the Armed Forces of the Russian Federation since 2019. He was promoted to the rank of colonel general on 17 February 2023.

References

1962 births
Living people
Russian colonel generals
People from Kuznetsk
Recipients of the Order of Zhukov
Recipients of the Order of Military Merit (Russia)
Recipients of the Order of Courage
Recipients of the Order of Honour (Russia)
Recipients of the Medal of the Order "For Merit to the Fatherland" II class
Frunze Military Academy alumni
Military Academy of the General Staff of the Armed Forces of Russia alumni